Nastja is a given name used in Russia and Russia-influenced countries. It is a diminutive form of the Greek name Anastasia. Other forms include Nastya, Nastia. Although historically the name has been feminine, in Slovenia, Nastja is a unisex name.

Nastja, Nastia, Nastya, or Nasťa may refer to:

 Nastia Liukin (1989–), Russian-American Olympic gymnast
 Nastia Gorshkova (born 1986), Russian fashion model

 Nastja Čeh (1978–), Slovenian footballer
 Nastja Govejšek, Slovenian swimmer
 Nastja Kolar (1994–), Slovenian tennis player

 Nastya Kamenskih (1987–), Ukrainian singer
 Like Nastya (born 2014), Russian YouTuber
 Nastya Ryzhikh (1977–), Russian-German pole vaulter whose name was Germanised to Anastasija Reiberger when she became a German citizen
 Nastya Sten (born 1995), Russian fashion model

Feminine given names
Czech feminine given names
Russian feminine given names
Serbian feminine given names
Slovene feminine given names
Slovene masculine given names